During the Spanish colonization of the Americas, the Spanish Main was the collective term for the parts of the Spanish Empire that were on the mainland of the Americas and had coastlines on the Caribbean Sea or Gulf of Mexico. The term was used to distinguish those regions from the numerous islands Spain controlled in the Caribbean, which were known as the Spanish West Indies.

Etymology 
The word "main" in the expression is a contraction of mainland.

Composition 
The Spanish Main included Spanish Florida and New Spain, the latter extending through modern-day Texas, Mexico, all of Central America, to Colombia and Venezuela on the north coast of South America. Major ports along this stretch of coastline included Veracruz, Porto Bello, Cartagena de Indias and Maracaibo.

The term is sometimes used in a more restricted sense that excludes the territories on the Gulf of Mexico. The Spanish Main then encompassed the Caribbean coastline from the Isthmus of Darien in Panama to the Orinoco delta on the coast of Venezuela. In this sense, the Spanish Main roughly coincides with the 16th century Province of Tierra Firme (Spanish for "mainland province").

Economic importance and piracy 

From the 16th to the early 19th century, enormous wealth was shipped from the Spanish Main to Spain in the form of gold, silver, gemstones, spices, hardwoods, hides and other valuable goods. Much of the wealth was silver in the form of pieces of eight, from the mines near Potosí. It was carried to the Spanish Main by llama and mule trains via the Pacific coast. Other goods originated in the Far East, having been carried to the Pacific coast of Spain's possessions on the Manila galleons, often through the port of Acapulco, then transported overland to the Spanish Main for onward shipment to Europe.

The Spanish Main became a frequent target for pirates, buccaneers, privateers and countries at war with Spain, seeking to capture some of these riches. To protect this wealth, the Spanish treasure fleet was equipped with heavily armed galleons. The organization of the fleets in large convoys proved highly successful, with only a few successful examples of major privateer attacks along the Spanish Main, such as the capture of Cartagena de Indias by Francis Drake in 1586; the capture of a Spanish treasure fleet sailing from Mexico by the Dutch West India Company in 1628; the capture of Chagres and Panama City by Henry Morgan in 1670–71; and the Raid on Cartagena by the French in 1697. Pirates operating in the area included the Dutchman Laurens de Graaf, who raided Veracruz in 1683 and Cartagena in 1697.

See also
 History of the Caribbean
 Piracy in the Caribbean

References

Further reading
 Sauer, Carl O. The Early Spanish Main. Berkeley and Los Angeles: University of California Press 1969.

External links
 Melfisher.org: Reefs, Wrecks and Rascals — archived version.

Spanish colonization of the Americas
Age of Sail
Piracy in the Atlantic Ocean
Colonial Central America
Colonial Mexico
Colonial Venezuela
Spanish Florida
Spanish West Indies
Viceroyalty of New Granada
History of the Atlantic Ocean
History of international trade
History of New Spain
Gulf Coast of Mexico
Gulf Coast of the United States
Economic history of Spain
Naval warfare of the Early Modern period
Anti-piracy
Sea lanes